Buena Vista is a plantation with a historic mansion located about  southeast of Stonewall, Louisiana, U.S.. It was built in 1859 for Boykin Witherspoon by M. Robbins.

The house has been listed on the National Register of Historic Places on January 19, 1989.

See also
National Register of Historic Places listings in DeSoto Parish, Louisiana

References

Houses on the National Register of Historic Places in Louisiana
Greek Revival architecture in Louisiana
Gothic Revival architecture in Louisiana
Houses completed in 1859
National Register of Historic Places in DeSoto Parish, Louisiana
Plantations in Louisiana
1859 establishments in Louisiana